The tadghtita is a type of bagpipe played by the Berbers of Algeria.

References

Berber musical instruments
Algerian musical instruments
Berber music
Bagpipes